Soraya Mouloudji (born 8 October 1977) is the Algerian Minister of Culture and Arts. She was appointed as minister on 9 September 2022.

Education 
Mouloudji holds a Doctorate in Translation and Anthropologie.

References 

1977 births
Living people
21st-century Algerian politicians
Algerian politicians
Government ministers of Algeria
Culture ministers of Algeria